Abraham (Aapo) Harjula (18 December 1880, in Laukaa – 7 September 1961) was a Finnish cooperative inspector and politician. He was a member of the Parliament of Finland from 1917 to 1918, representing the Social Democratic Party of Finland (SDP). During the 1918 Finnish Civil War Harjula was a member of the Central Workers' Council of Finland. After the war he was in prison until 1921.

References

1880 births
1961 deaths
People from Laukaa
People from Vaasa Province (Grand Duchy of Finland)
Social Democratic Party of Finland politicians
Members of the Parliament of Finland (1917–19)
People of the Finnish Civil War (Red side)
Prisoners and detainees of Finland